Robert James Sinclair (born 29 August 1989) is an English football manager and footballer who is the manager of Spartan South Midlands Football League Division One club Real Bedford. Sinclair started his career in the youth system at Luton Town, signing a professional contract in July 2007. He was loaned out to Conference Premier club Salisbury City in January 2008, until the end of the 2007–08 season. On returning to his parent club in May 2008, Sinclair was released, and joined Salisbury on a permanent basis later that month. Injury disrupted his time at the club, playing 54 games during his two-and-a-half-year spell.

Sinclair left Salisbury when the club were relegated two divisions after a breach of rules on unpaid debts, and he joined Stevenage of League Two on a free transfer in June 2010. Stevenage earned promotion to League One in his first season with the club. Following a brief loan spell at Aldershot Town in March 2012, Sinclair left Stevenage in June 2012, only to rejoin the club three months later. He was loaned out once again to Aldershot in November 2012. He left Stevenage by mutual consent in January 2013, and signed for Salisbury City, his second spell at the club. Sinclair was a part of the team that gained promotion to the Conference Premier during the 2012–13 season.

He signed for Forest Green Rovers in June 2014, helping them earn promotion to the Football League during the 2016–17 season. In the summer of 2017, Sinclair elected to play semi-professionally for Oxford City and then in November 2018 joined another semi-professional team in the form of National League South club Hemel Hempstead Town. He signed for hometown club Bedford Town in July 2020, where he spent one season. Sinclair made the transition from playing to coaching, joining Dunstable Town as a first-team coach in October 2021 before being appointed as manager of Eynesbury Rovers later that month. After a season at Eynesbury, Sinclair was appointed manager of Real Bedford in May 2022.

Early life
Sinclair was born and raised in Bedford. He attended Wootton Upper School. He has two brothers, Stuart Sinclair and Scott, who both went on to play football at a professional and semi-professional level.

Career

Early career
Sinclair began his career as a trainee with Luton Town, and was a regular in the club's under-18 and reserve teams, where he played as a right winger. He progressed through the youth system at Luton, and signed a one-year professional contract with the club in July 2007. On signing the deal, Sinclair said "I've been at Luton since I was eight so you can say it's something of a dream. The club have been great and really helped bring my game on". Sinclair did not break through into the Luton first-team during the 2007–08 season and was subsequently loaned out to Conference Premier club Salisbury City on 31 January 2008. He made his debut for Salisbury in the club's 1–0 victory against Northwich Victoria on 9 February 2008, playing the whole match. Sinclair scored his first professional goal in a 3–2 defeat at Woking on 24 March 2008, scoring the equalising goal in the first-half. He played 16 times for Salisbury during the club's 2007–08 season, scoring once. Of his three-month loan spell, Sinclair said "It's been very enjoyable. It's worked out very well for me, first-team football has helped me massively. It's about the physical side mainly". Sinclair was released by Luton at the end of the season in May 2008 having not made any first-team appearances for the club.

Salisbury City
Following his departure from Luton, Sinclair joined Salisbury City of the Conference Premier on a permanent basis, signing a two-year contract on 22 May 2008. Salisbury manager Nick Holmes stated that Sinclair impressed him during his loan spell and would play a major part in the club's upcoming season. He missed the start of the 2008–09 season due to a knee injury, which he suffered in Salisbury's pre-season friendly against Port Vale. The injury ultimately ruled him out of the first-team for two months, and he returned to the starting eleven on 18 October 2008, playing 64 minutes in Salisbury's 2–0 defeat to Stevenage Borough. Sinclair's only goal of the 2008–09 season came in Salisbury's final match of the season, on 26 April 2009, scoring their first goal from long range in a 2–2 draw against Ebbsfleet United. In an injury-disrupted season, Sinclair played 15 times in all competitions, scoring one goal. He made 29 appearances for Salisbury during the 2009–10 season without scoring. Sinclair left Salisbury when the club were relegated two divisions after a breach of Conference rules on unpaid debts.

Stevenage
Sinclair signed for League Two club Stevenage on 4 June 2010. On joining the Hertfordshire club, Sinclair said "signing for Stevenage just came out of the blue. With all the trouble Salisbury were in we did not know what league we were going to be in next season and as such the club couldn't offer contracts". Sinclair made his Stevenage debut in the club's first ever Football League fixture, a 2–2 draw against Macclesfield Town on 7 August 2010, coming on as a substitute in the 71st-minute of the match. He subsequently started in the club's next game just two days later, playing 75 minutes in the side's 2–1 defeat to Portsmouth in the League Cup. Sinclair scored his first goals for the club on 26 March 2011, scoring twice in Stevenage's 4–0 victory against Macclesfield Town at Moss Rose. Sinclair suffered a groin injury in training the week after Stevenage's 3–3 draw with Bury, resulting in him missing Stevenage's successful play-off campaign, which resulted in the club earning promotion to League One. He played 31 games for Stevenage in his first season with the club, scoring two goals.

The injury ultimately ruled Sinclair out of the first half of the 2011–12 season. Sinclair revealed that there had been a number of complications with the injury, with his "tendon coming away from the bone by two centimetres", as well as the doctor refusing to give him injections as a result of the tendon movement. Having failed to make any first-team appearances for Stevenage as a result of the injury, Sinclair joined League Two club Aldershot Town on a one-month loan deal on 13 March 2012, in order to gain match fitness. He made his debut for Aldershot later that day, coming on as an 85th-minute substitute in a 2–2 away draw with Crawley Town. Sinclair made four appearances during his loan spell at Aldershot, three of which as a substitute. He returned to Stevenage on 9 April 2012, but ultimately did not make any appearances for the club during the campaign.

In June 2012, Sinclair left Stevenage despite being offered a one-year contract extension, stating he wanted to play first-team football and did not want to be "a bit-part player". Three months later, in early September, he rejoined the club on a one-year contract. Having not played for Stevenage during the opening months of the 2012–13 season, Sinclair joined Aldershot Town for a second loan spell on 6 November 2012, joining on a one-month agreement, which was later extended for a further month. Sinclair made seven appearances for Aldershot during the two-month loan spell. He returned to Stevenage, but did not make any first-team appearances for the remainder of his time there.

Return to Salisbury City
Sinclair returned to Salisbury City, with the club competing in the Conference South, on 31 January 2013, joining on a free transfer after leaving Stevenage by mutual consent. Signing for Salisbury meant that Sinclair would be playing alongside his brother, Stuart Sinclair, for the first time in his professional career, Sinclair scored on his first appearance back at Salisbury, coming on as a 57th-minute substitute and scoring Salisbury's second goal in an eventual 3–1 home victory over Bromley on 2 February 2013. He played regularly for Salisbury during the second half of the 2012–13 season as Salisbury won promotion back to the Conference Premier via the play-offs. Sinclair made 19 appearances during the campaign, scoring twice.

Ahead of the 2013–14 season, Sinclair signed a one-year contract extension to remain at Salisbury for their return to the Conference Premier. He started in the club's first game back in the first tier of non-League, a 1–0 defeat to Tamworth at the Raymond McEnhill Stadium on 10 August 2013. He missed four months of the season through injury, returning to the first-team in January 2014. Sinclair made 21 appearances during the season. Despite Salisbury finishing in mid-table, they were relegated at the end of the season due to financial irregularities.

Forest Green Rovers
At the end of the season, in June 2014, Sinclair was one of three Salisbury players to join Conference Premier club Forest Green Rovers. He signed a two-year contract with the club. Sinclair made his Forest Green debut on the opening day of the 2014–15 season on 9 August 2014, playing the whole match in a 1–0 away win at Southport. He scored his first goal for the club in Forest Green's 2–1 home loss to Barnet at The New Lawn on 27 September 2014. Due to his performances throughout the month of October 2014, Sinclair was named as the Conference Premier Player of the Month on 2 November 2014. He made 46 appearances and scored three times as Forest Green lost at the Conference Premier play-off semi-final stage to Bristol Rovers by a 3–0 aggregate scoreline.

Sinclair played 42 times during the 2015–16 season. Despite helping the club get the play-off final by playing in all of the club's end of season matches, including both of the play-off semi-final matches against Dover Athletic, Sinclair missed the National League play-off final defeat to Grimsby Town at Wembley Stadium due to injury. At the end of the season, he agreed a new two-year contract to remain at the club until the summer of 2018.

Having been a regular starter during the first half of the 2016–17 campaign, injury meant that Sinclair played fewer matches during the second part of the season. He played just once in the final two months of the season, missing all of the club's play-off matches as Forest Green earned promotion via the National League play-offs at the third time attempt. He made 22 appearances during the campaign.

Oxford City
Having not made any appearances for Forest Green in the opening weeks of the 2017–18 season, Sinclair left the club to join National League South club Oxford City on a free transfer on 25 August 2017, despite interest from National League clubs Barrow and Wrexham. He made his debut for the club a day after signing, scoring the first goal of the match in a 1–1 draw at home with Welling United. Sinclair was a part of the squad that reached the FA Cup second round for the second time in the club's history, playing the whole match in a 1–0 away win at League Two club Colchester United on 4 November 2017. He also scored in Oxford City's 3–2 loss to Notts County at Meadow Lane in the following round on 2 December 2017. Sinclair scored three times in five matches during December, and was subsequently named as the National League South Player of the Month. Sinclair played in the final as Oxford City won the Oxfordshire Senior Cup courtesy of a 5–3 victory over Kidlington on 1 May 2018. He played regularly throughout the remainder of the season, making 41 appearances in all competitions, scoring 11 goals.

He remained at Oxford City for the start of the 2018–19 season, scoring his first goal of the season in a 1–0 win over eventual champions Torquay United on 14 August 2018. He scored four times in 12 games in the opening three months of the season, including twice in a 5–0 FA Cup victory against Hemel Hempstead Town on 23 October 2018. He left the club by mutual consent on 2 November 2018, which was described as a "huge blow". On his departure, Oxford City stated a "change in personal circumstances" meant Sinclair was no longer able to play for the club. He made 53 appearances and scored 15 times in his time there.

Hemel Hempstead Town
Following his departure from Oxford City, Sinclair joined fellow National League South club Hemel Hempstead Town on 5 November 2018. The move meant that Sinclair was reunited with new Hemel manager Joe Deeney, who had just left his role as assistant manager at Oxford City and subsequently made Sinclair his second signing since his appointment. Sinclair made his Hemel debut in the club's 2–1 home win against Gloucester City on 10 November 2018, scoring the first goal of the match. Sinclair scored four times in his first six games for Hemel, which included two second-half goals in a comeback victory at East Thurrock United on 17 November 2018. He suffered an injury during the second half of the 2018–19 season that resulted in him missing two months of the season, returning for Hemel's final two league matches of the campaign. He made 14 appearances for Hemel during the season, scoring four goals. Shortly after the end of the season, in April 2019, Sinclair turned down the opportunity to become manager at Weston-super-Mare.

Bedford Town
Sinclair joined Southern League Division One Central club Bedford Town on 16 July 2020, signing a one-year contract. He debuted for his hometown club in a 1–0 defeat to Daventry Town in the FA Cup preliminary round on 12 September 2020. Sinclair made nine appearances during the 2020–21 season before Bedford's season was curtailed due to restrictions associated with the COVID-19 pandemic.

Managerial career

Eynesbury Rovers
After spending time as a first-team coach at Dunstable Town, Sinclair was appointed as manager of Eynesbury Rovers in the United Counties League Premier Division South on 18 October 2021. The club finished the 2021–22 season in ninth position in the league standings.

Real Bedford
Sinclair left Eynesbury in order to take on the role of first-team manager at Spartan South Midlands Football League Division One club Real Bedford on 10 May 2022.

Style of play
Despite starting his career as a winger, Sinclair has largely been deployed as a central midfielder during his professional career. After signing Sinclair in June 2014, Forest Green manager Adrian Pennock described him as "a very intelligent footballer", as well as praising his work ethic – "his work ethic is fantastic and he works extremely hard for the team. He's very clever with the ball, he finds space very easily and creates opportunities". He has also been described as combative and cultured in the way he plays football.

Personal life
He set up Sinclair Sports Coaching in 2017, which offers sports coaching on a number of different sports, as well as offering curriculum PE programmes together with extra curricular clubs in schools.

Career statistics

A.  The "Other" column constitutes appearances and goals (including those as a substitute) in the FA Trophy, Football League Trophy, Conference South play-offs, National League play-offs and Oxfordshire Senior Cup.

Honours
Stevenage
 League Two play-offs: 2010–11

Salisbury City
 Conference South play-offs: 2012–13

Forest Green Rovers
 National League play-offs: 2016–17

Oxford City
 Oxfordshire Senior Cup: 2017–18

Individual
 Conference Premier Player of the Month: October 2014
 National League South Player of the Month: December 2017

References

External links

1989 births
Living people
Sportspeople from Bedford
English footballers
Association football midfielders
Luton Town F.C. players
Salisbury City F.C. players
Stevenage F.C. players
Aldershot Town F.C. players
Forest Green Rovers F.C. players
Oxford City F.C. players
Hemel Hempstead Town F.C. players
Bedford Town F.C. players
English Football League players
National League (English football) players
Footballers from Bedfordshire